Palace of Youth and Sports (formerly named "Boro and Ramiz") is a multi-purpose hall located in Pristina, Kosovo. It includes two indoor arenas, the larger of which has a capacity of 8,000 spectators, and the smaller a capacity of 3,000 spectators. It also includes a shopping mall, indoor parking, two convention halls and a library. The building in its entirety measures over 10,000 square meters.

History
In 1975, a referendum was held, and citizens of Pristina, then capital of the Socialist Autonomous Province of Kosovo, voted in favor of building a large hall. The complex was finished in 1977. It was originally named "Boro and Ramiz", after two World War II Yugoslav Partisans and People's heroes of Yugoslavia, Boro Vukmirović and Ramiz Sadiku. Vukmirović was a Serb, while Sadiku was an Albanian, therefore named so to symbolize brotherhood and unity between Serbs and Albanians.

The building was heavily damaged in a fire on 25 February 2000. It was partially renovated, but the larger arena and the convention hall are still out of use. 

The ownership of the building is disputed between the Municipality of Pristina and the Kosovo Privatization Agency.

Building
The smaller arena is mostly used for basketball by KB Prishtina. In April 2014, it hosted the Final Four of the Balkan Basketball League. The arena is also used for futsal, handball, athletics, basketball, volleyball, numerous other sporting competitions, various concerts, exhibitions, fairs, conventions, and congresses.

The larger arena is currently out of use due to a fire in 2000. Commentators and fans have called for the "Greater Coliseum" to be renovated and used for KB Pristina's home games.

The shopping center has a series of services such as a joint parking lot, 6D cinema, wellness center, numerous restaurants, cafes, and stores.

The Newborn monument is located in front of the building.

Notes

References

External links

 

Buildings and structures in Pristina
Sports venues in Kosovo
Indoor arenas in Kosovo
Basketball venues in Kosovo
Buildings and structures completed in 1977